Ostraciidae is a family of squared, bony fish belonging to the order Tetraodontiformes, closely related to the pufferfishes and filefishes. Fish in the family are known variously as boxfishes, cofferfishes, cowfishes and trunkfishes. It contains about 23 extant species in 6 extant genera.

Description
Members of this family occur in a variety of different colors, and are notable for the hexagonal or "honeycomb" patterns on their skin. They swim in a rowing manner. Their hexagonal plate-like scales are fused together into a solid, triangular or box-like carapace, from which the fins, tail, eyes and mouth protrude. Because of these heavy armoured scales, Ostraciidae are limited to slow movements, but few other fish are able to eat the adults. Ostraciid boxfish of the genus Lactophrys also secrete poisons from their skin into the surrounding water, further protecting them from predation. Although the adults are in general quite square in shape, young Ostraciidae are more rounded. The young often exhibit brighter colors than the adults.

Range
Ostraciids occur in the Atlantic, Indian, and Pacific oceans, generally at middle latitudes, although the common or buffalo trunkfish (Lactophrys trigonus) which lives mainly in Florida waters may be found as far north as Cape Cod.

Toxic defences
The various members of this family are able to secrete cationic surfactants through their skin which can act as a chemical defense mechanism. An example of this is pahutoxin, a water-soluble, crystalline chemical toxin that is contained in mucus secreted from the skin of Ostracion lentiginosus and other members of the trunkfish family when they are under stress. Pahutoxin is a choline chloride ester of 3-acetoxypalmitic acid that behaves similarly to steroidal saponins found in echinoderms. When this toxic mucus is released from the fish, it quickly dissolves in the environment and negatively affects any fish in the surrounding area. It is possible since this toxin resembles certain detergents so closely, that adding these detergents as pollutants to seawater has potential to interfere with receptor-mediated processes in marine life.

Classification

The author Keiichi Matsuura lists the following genera and species:

Fossil taxa 
 Genus Eolactoria
 Eolactoria sorbinii Tyler 1976 (Lutetian of Monte Bolca, Eocene Italy)
 Genus Oligolactoria
 Oligolactoria bubiki Tyler 1980 (Rupelian of Moravia, Oligocene Czech Republic)

Extant taxa 
 Acanthostracion
 Lactophrys
 Lactoria
 Ostracion
 Paracanthostracion
 Tetrosomus

References

 
Marine fish families
Taxa named by Constantine Samuel Rafinesque